Keith Harvey Stride (born 10 January 1944) is a former English cricketer.  Stride was a right-handed batsman who bowled left-arm fast-medium.  He was born in Dunstall, Staffordshire.

Stride made his debut for Staffordshire in the 1970 Minor Counties Championship against Norfolk.  Stride played Minor counties cricket for Staffordshire from 1970 to 1978, which included 37 Minor Counties Championship matches.  In 1975, he made his debut in List A cricket for Minor Counties North in the Benson & Hedges Cup against Lancashire.  It was in that same season that he made his debut in that format for Staffordshire against Leicestershire in the Gillette Cup.  He mae 3 further appearances in List A cricket for the county, the last coming against Sussex in the 1978 Gillette Cup.  In his 4 List A matches for the county, he took 9 wickets an average of 18.22, with best figures of 3/66.

References

External links
Keith Stride at ESPNcricinfo
Keith Stride at CricketArchive

1944 births
Living people
People from the Borough of East Staffordshire
English cricketers
Staffordshire cricketers
Minor Counties cricketers